Don't Close Your Eyes may refer to:

Albums 
 Don't Close Your Eyes (album), by Keith Whitley
 Don't Close Your Eyes (EP), by Parkway Drive

Songs 
 "Don't Close Your Eyes" (Keith Whitley song)
 "Don't Close Your Eyes" (Kix song)
 "Don't Close Your Eyes" (Max Jason Mai song)
 "Don't Close Your Eyes Ashamed", by Kxng Crooked, Truth Ali, and Jonathan Hay